Lucien Joulin (1907–1964) was a French cinematographer. As well as working on feature films he also shot several documentaries.

Selected filmography
 Madame Angot's Daughter (1935)
 Frederica (1942)
 The Farm of Seven Sins (1949)
 The Man from Jamaica (1950)
 Vendetta in Camargue (1950)
 Without Trumpet or Drum (1950)
 Victor (1951)
 The Beautiful Image (1951)
 Alarm in Morocco (1953)
 The Count of Bragelonne (1954)
 Milord l'Arsouille (1955)
 La châtelaine du Liban (1956)
 The Singer from Mexico (1957)
 Tabarin (1958)
 Serenade of Texas (1958)
 Cigarettes, Whiskey and Wild Women (1959)
 Sun in Your Eyes (1962)
 Nick Carter va tout casser (1964)

References

Bibliography
 Bertin-Maghit, Jean-Pierre. Propaganda Documentaries in France: 1940-1944. Rowman & Littlefield, 2016.

External links

1907 births
1964 deaths
Cinematographers from Paris